The 2020–21 VCU Rams women's basketball team represents Virginia Commonwealth University during the 2020–21 NCAA Division I women's basketball season. It is the program's 47th season of existence, and their eighth season in the Atlantic 10 Conference. The Rams are led by seventh year head coach Beth O'Boyle and play their home games at the Stuart C. Siegel Center.

Previous season 

VCU finished the 2019–20 season with an 20–12 record and a 13–3 record in Atlantic 10 play, finishing second in the Atlantic 10. VCU were seeded second in the 2020 Atlantic 10 women's basketball tournament, where they defeated Davidson and Fordham en route to the Atlantic 10 Championship. There, they lost to Dayton in the final. VCU was considered a potential at-large bid for the 2020 Women's National Invitation Tournament, but all postseason tournaments were cancelled by the NCAA due to rising concerns with the COVID-19 pandemic.

Offseason

Departures

Transfers

2020 recruiting class

Preseason

A10 media poll
The Atlantic 10 men's basketball media poll was released on November 9, 2020. VCU was picked to win the regular season.

Preseason honors

Roster

Schedule

|-
!colspan=12 style=| Non-conference regular season
|-

|-
!colspan=12 style=|Atlantic 10 regular season
|-

|-
!colspan=12 style=|Atlantic 10 Tournament
|-

|-
!colspan=12 style=| NCAA Women's Tournament
|-

|-

See also 
 2020–21 VCU Rams men's basketball team

References

External links 
 VCU Women's Basketball

VCU
VCU Rams women's basketball
VCU Rams women's basketball
VCU Rams women's basketball
VCU Rams women's basketball
VCU Rams women's basketball seasons
VCU